The Church of India, Burma and Ceylon (CIBC) was the autonomous ecclesiastical province of the Anglican Communion in British India.

The first Anglican diocese in India was established in 1813, the Diocese of Calcutta, which became the metropolitan see of the Church of India, Burma and Ceylon. The Church of India, Burma and Ceylon spread as missionaries from the Church Mission Society travelled throughout the Indian Empire. By 1930, the Church of India, Burma and Ceylon (CIBC) had fourteen dioceses across the Indian Empire. Bishops from India were present at the first Lambeth Conference.

After partition of India in 1947, the Church of India, Burma and Ceylon became known as the Church of India, Pakistan, Burma and Ceylon (CIPBC). It published its own version of the Book of Common Prayer, which served as its authorised liturgical text.

Later in 1947, four southern dioceses left the CIPBC and merged with South Indian Methodists and South Indian Presbyterians & Congregationalists to form the Church of South India. In 1970, ecumenical dialogue led to the merger of the parts of the Church of India, Burma and Ceylon in India and Pakistan with other Protestant Christian denominations (including the Scottish Presbyterians, United Methodists and Lutherans), thus creating the Church of North India and Church of Pakistan, and to the creation of separate provinces of Sri Lanka and Burma.

Dioceses 
Diocese of Calcutta (established in 1814)
Diocese of Madras (established in 1835)
Diocese of Bombay (established in 1837)
Diocese of Colombo (established in 1845)
Diocese of Lahore (established in 1877)
Diocese of Rangoon (established in 1877)
Diocese of Travancore (established in 1879)
Diocese of Chota Nagpur (established in 1890)
Diocese of Lucknow (established in 1893)
Diocese of Tinnevelly (established in 1896)
Diocese of Nagpur (established in 1903)
Diocese of Dornakal (established in 1912)
Diocese of Assam (established in 1915)
Diocese of Nasik (established in 1929)

See also 

 Christianity in India
 Christianity in Pakistan
 Christianity in Ceylon
 Christianity in Burma

References 

 
1813 establishments in British India
1970 disestablishments in India
Anglican Communion church bodies